Badanaguppe is a village in Chamarajanagar district of Karnataka state, India.

Location
Badanaguppe is located 11 km from Chamarajanagar town and 157 km from Bangalore, on the highway between Chamarajanagar and Nanjangud town.

Economy
The people of the village are completely agrarian in their occupation.  There is a branch of Canara Bank in the village. 
The provincial government has started a  project on 1,595 acres of land called Badanaguppe-Kellamballi Industrial Estate which will include sectors like automobile, food processing, textiles, leather, granite and agriculture related industries.

Tourist attractions
 Panyada Hundi temple, Badanaguppe.

Post office
There is a post office at Badanaguppe and the pin code is 571313.

Nearby places
Nanjedevanapura (8 km), Mukkadahalli (9 km), Madapura (10 km), Harave (10 km), Kuderu (10 km) are the nearby villages to Badanaguppe.

Demographics
3,498 people live in Badanaguppe and there are 717 houses in the village.  The area of the village is 1,139 hectares.

Transportation
The village is served by Badanaguppe railway station, and Konanur railway station is also nearby. The village is on the highway from Chamarajanagar to Mysore.

Image gallery

See also
Chinnadagudihundi
Badanavalu 
Narasam Budhi
Kavalande
Mariyala
Kellamballi

References

Villages in Chamarajanagar district